A list of films produced in Pakistan in 1971 (see 1971 in film) and in the Urdu language:

1971

See also
 1971 in Pakistan

References

External links
 Search Pakistani film - IMDB.com

1971
Pakistani
Films